The 12th Korea Drama Awards is an awards ceremony for excellence in television in South Korea. It was held on October 2, 2019.

Nominations and winners
Nominations were announced on September 27, 2019. Winners are denoted in bold.

References

External links 
  

2019 television awards
 12
2019 in South Korea